Leninogorsk may refer to:

Leninogorsk, Russia, a town in the Republic of Tatarstan, Russia
Leninogorsk, name of Ridder, a town in Kazakhstan, in 1941–2002